Kristin's false shieldback (Acilacris kristinae) is a tettigoniid orthopteran that is endemic to two localities within Malta Forest in Limpopo, South Africa. It is threatened by deforestation and changes in its microclimate. It is a diurnal insect, and has a daily rhythm. It has a hemimetabolous metamorphosis which results in no pupal stage. It is a predator and feeds on aphids.

References

Tettigoniidae
Insects described in 1996
Critically endangered insects
Endemic insects of South Africa